Kenjgewin Teg (formerly Kenjgewin Teg Educational Institute) is an Aboriginal-owned and controlled post-secondary institution at M'Chigeeng First Nation, on Mnidoo Mnising Manitoulin Island, Ontario, Canada. In the Ojibwe language, Kenjgewin Teg means a place of knowledge.

Programs are offered to its eight-member First Nations: 
 Aundeck Omni Kaning First Nation
 Constance Lake First Nation 
 M'Chigeeng First Nation
 Sagamok First Nation 
 Sheguiandah First Nation
 Sheshegwaning First Nation
 Whitefish River First Nation
 Zhiibaahaasing First Nation

History
In April 1994 the Wautebek Training Institute and Nda-Gkenjge-Gamig Educational Institute merged to create the Kenjgewin Teg Educational Institute (KTEI). Kenjgewin Teg developed Joint Management Committees with the affiliated educational institutions.

In January, 2022, Kenjgewin Teg received accreditation from the Indigenous Advanced Education and Skills Council to offer certificates, diplomas and degrees.

Partnerships

University
 Indigenous Teacher Education Program, Queens' University
 Master of Education in World Indigenous Studies in Education (WISE), Queens' University
 Master of Social Work, Indigenous Field of Study, Laurentian University

College
 Practical Nursing, Fleming College
 Personal Support Worker, Canadore College
 Anishinaabemowin Early Childhood Education, Canadore College
 Renovation Techniques: Construction Carpentry, Canadore College

See also

United Chiefs and Councils of Manitoulin

References

External links
 

1994 establishments in Ontario
Educational institutions established in 1994
First Nations education
Indigenous universities and colleges in North America
Universities and colleges in Ontario